USCGC Staten Island (WAGB-278) was a United States Coast Guard . Laid down on 9 June 1942 and launched on 28 December 1942, the ship was commissioned on 26 February 1944, and almost immediately afterward transferred to the Soviet Union, under the Lend Lease program, under the name Severny Veter, which loosely translates as Northwind, until 19 December 1951. When returned to the United States Navy, she was designated USS Northwind until 15 April 1952, when she was renamed Staten Island to distinguish her from her successor  which had been laid down shortly after she was lent to the Soviet Union. The ship was transferred to the U.S. Coast Guard as USCGC Staten Island in February 1965, and served until November 1974, before being scrapped.

Construction

Staten Island was one of the icebreakers designed by Lieutenant commander Edward Thiele and Gibbs & Cox of New York, who modeled them after plans for European icebreakers he obtained before the start of World War II.
She was the first of seven completed ships of the Wind-class of icebreakers operated by the United States Coast Guard. She was laid down on 9 June 1942 at Western Pipe and Steel Company shipyards in San Pedro, California, launched on 28 December 1942 and commissioned on 26 February 1944. Once commissioned, she was almost immediately transferred to the Soviet Union under the Lend-Lease program.1944.

Her hull was of unprecedented strength and structural integrity, with a relatively short length in proportion to the great power developed, a cut away forefoot, rounded bottom, and fore, aft and side heeling tanks. Diesel electric machinery was chosen for its controllability and resistance to damage.

Staten Island had her designed heavy armament reduced to four single 3"50cal., eight single 40mm., and two depth charge racks for Soviet service. After her return she received a single 5"38 cal. mount forward and a helicopter deck aft. In USCG service she had the forward mount removed.

Service history

Soviet Union (1944–1951)
Severny Veter, ( or "North Wind"), was transferred to the Soviet Navy in February 1944 through the Lend-Lease program, serving in the Northern Route Command. In 1946 she was renamed Kapitan Belousov after Soviet icebreaker commander Captain M.P. Belousov. Custody of Belousov was returned to the United States Navy on 19 December 1951 at Bremerhaven, Germany.

United States Navy (1951–1966)
On 19 December 1951 the ship was renamed USS Northwind. On 25 February 1952 the Northwind arrived at Boston Naval Shipyard, Boston, Massachusetts, for overhaul and fitting out as a unit of the United States Atlantic Fleet.

On 15 April 1952 she was renamed Staten Island to distinguish her from her successor ship , which had been laid down shortly after the ship was sent to the Soviets. Staten Island was named for the New York City borough of Staten Island. Coincidentally, the major interstate highway that runs through the borough is numbered as Interstate 278.

Overhaul was completed by 30 June 1952, and on 1 July 1952 she sailed from Boston to Grenfell Sound, Labrador, to conduct ice reconnaissance in Frobisher Bay, returning to Boston on 8 September.

Staten Island departed Boston for Resolution Island on 25 April 1953 to relieve , returning to Boston on 10 June. During August, Staten Island became the first U.S. Navy ship to cut through the Davis Strait from Thule to Ellesmere Island.

In the following year, 1954, Staten Island was involved in three ice breaking operations through 15 December 1954.

In 1955 her home port was changed to Seattle, Washington. Staten Island sailed for Seattle on 19 May 1955, and arrived there on 10 June 1955 for duty with Service Squadron 1. From June through September 1955, she broke ice for ships resupplying the Distant Early Warning Line radar stations, returning to Seattle on 28 September 1955.

Staten Island departed Seattle on 5 July 1956 to lead another convoy of resupply ships bound for the Distant Early Warning Line through the ice, returning to Seattle on 6 September 1956. She was then assigned to Operation Deep Freeze II and departed Seattle for Antarctica on 3 November 1956. Staten Island rendezvoused with cargo ship  near the Panama Canal Zone before both continued on for Antarctica, arriving on 15 December 1956 at the Weddell Sea pack ice, and then breaking through the Antarctic Circle on 20 December 1956 en route to Cape Adams. The icebreaker led Wyandot from Cape Adams to Gould Bay where Ellsworth Station was then assembled. She departed Gould Bay on 15 February 1957 to return home to Seattle, arriving there on 5 April 1957.

On 15 October 1963 while on the summer Arctic mission, the captain, Commander John Metschl, and a Navy helicopter pilot were lost at sea doing ice reconnaissance. The only remains found were one of the helicopter's pontoons floating at sea.

On 1 February 1966, Staten Island was decommissioned by the United States Navy and struck from the Naval Vessel Register on 1 March 1966.

United States Coast Guard (1966–1974)
She was then transferred to the United States Coast Guard, where she was redesignated USCGC Staten Island (WAGB-278), and home-ported at Seattle. During the summer of 1966, the engineering plant was upgraded and modifications were made to the flight deck and hangar to allow operation of a HH-52A Seaguard Helicopter. The Coast Guard then deployed her to Antarctica as part of that season's "Operation Deep Freeze" on 22 September 1966.

Staten Island returned from her Antarctic voyage on 6 April 1967 and was then sent into the Arctic Ocean above Alaska for four months during the spring and summer of 1967 during which time she ran aground while traveling west from Prudhoe Bay and sustained minor damage.

During July and August 1968 Staten Island was assigned to conduct an oceanographic survey of the Chukchi Sea-Bering Strait area as part of a cooperative effort between the Coast Guard Oceanographic Unit, the University of Alaska and the University of Washington.

On 10–11 March 1969, she attempted to assist in the salvage of the fishing vessel FV Martindale which had run aground off Akun Island. Disaster struck when her landing craft (LCVP) capsized while attempting to help pass a towline from the fishing vessel Dauntless to the Martindale, resulting in the death of her Deck Division Chief, BMC Elias Welch. The LCVP was later salvaged and the crew of the Martindale evacuated.

Staten Island was dispatched to the Arctic Ocean on 7 July 1969 as an oceanographic research platform and escort vessel for supply operations. There she helped  reach open water off Point Barrow on 7 September 1969, relieved Northwind on 22 September 1969 after that vessel suffered engine trouble, and assisted the Canadian icebreaker  in escorting the tanker  eastward through the Northwest Passage. Staten Island arrived in New York on 9 November 1969, and departed for Seattle on 9 December 1969 by way of the Panama Canal with stops in San Juan, Puerto Rico, and Acapulco, Mexico.

She departed Seattle on 6 July 1970 to conduct scientific tests and evaluation of crude oil spread rate in the Arctic Ocean. Later that summer when a large group of 20 tugboats and 40 barges bound for Prudhoe Bay with vital supplies became trapped in pack ice, Staten Island worked around the clock for 3 days to tow and push the barges to open water. Staten Island departed Seattle once more later in 1970 as part of "Operation Deep Freeze 1971".

After completing temporary repairs in Melbourne, Australia and certified seaworthy,  was ordered to escort the Staten Island home to Seattle.

In mid-March 1972, during "Operation Deep Freeze", while en route from Dunedin, New Zealand, to Suva, Fiji, Staten Island was broadsided by a rogue wave and came within 2 degrees of capsizing. While ascending the ladder to the bridge to relieve the helmsman, Seaman Cotten hailed the Officer of the Deck moments before an  wall of water struck the port beam. With the bridge doors open the bridge instantly filled with water, as well as the stairwell in which Seaman Cotten was prevented from ascending. The ship listed heavily to starboard, began to shake with one propeller turning in the air, then rolled back to port causing the starboard wing to scoop up seawater, sending everyone splashing toward the overhead (again). Only one man was injured; a fireman climbing up from the engine room who twisted an ankle. In early March 1972 Staten Island became the first United States government vessel to enter the port in Dunedin.

Later in 1972 the ship departed Seattle for Arctic Summer North carrying scientists from the University of Anchorage, the University of Washington, and the Smithsonian Institution to make determinations on the effects drilling for oil on the north slope of Alaska would have on the environment.

From 7 March through 3 April 1973, she was attached to Task Unit 57.0 of the Pacific Fleet during SUBICEX 1-73. Completing her SUBICEX assignments she sailed south and while leaving the frozen sections of the Bering Sea she took heavy swells over her bow including large chunks of ice that damaged her superstructure. On 4 April 1973 her starboard main electric drive motor caught fire. With that motor out of commission her port motor remained in service as she limped into Kodiak, Alaska and finally onto Seattle arriving 12 April 1973. Staten Island was drydocked for repairs the remainder of that summer.

Staten Island departed Seattle 31 October 1973 for San Diego where her crew received refresher training between 5 and 16 November 1973, at which time she departed to escort ships in "Operation Deep Freeze 1974". Staten Island helped rescue the USNS Maumee when her rudder became damaged in the heavy ice at McMurdo.  The Staten Island crew freed the rudder from its jammed position at 90 degrees and fixed the rudder with a rudimentary manual steering gear allowing USNS Maumee to make her way to New Zealand for repairs. Staten Island returned from Antarctica to Seattle via stops in Chile, Peru, and Mexico during April 1974.  In August and September 1974 Staten Island conducted her final deployment. Her crew completed the Arctic West Summer activities, thereby capping a 30-year ice breaking career in the polar regions of the world.

Staten Island was decommissioned on 15 November 1974, and sold for scrap.

Awards
Staten Island was awarded the Coast Guard Unit Commendation with Operational Distinguishing Device for the periods of 23 September–8 October 1967, 21 September–1 November 1969 and 7 March 1973 – 3 April 1973. She was awarded another Navy Meritorious Unit Commendation for her service in Task Force 43 from 5 December 1973 through 22 February 1974. Staten Island also earned two awards of the National Defense Service Medal

References

External links

 United States Coast Guard Historian's Office  Accessed 20 December 2021.

Wind-class icebreakers
Ships transferred from the United States Navy to the United States Coast Guard
Ships built in Los Angeles
Staten Island
1942 ships
Ships transferred from the United States Navy to the Soviet Navy